Postel Abbey is a Premonstratensian abbey in the Belgian municipality of Mol in the province of Antwerp.

History
In 1138, Premonstratensian canons from Floreffe Abbey founded the monastery at Postel as a dependent priory. In 1613, Postel became independent of Floreffe and in 1618 was raised to the status of abbey. In 1797, the abbey was closed, and the canons expelled, in the course of the French Revolution, when French troops invaded the Austrian Netherlands. In 1847, the community here was re-established, after which the abbey buildings were restored in several phases.

From 1943, until the end of World War II, Herman Van Breda hid part of the manuscripts of Edmund Husserl (Husserl Archives) in the abbey.

Architecture

The abbey church was built in the Rhineland Romanesque style and dates supposedly from the end of the 12th century (1190). The church has since been rebuilt several times, as a result of which the building shows some characteristics of Gothic and Baroque styles. The abbey was surrounded by walls, and partially surrounded by ditches.

Products of the abbey
Traditionally, Postel abbey produces Postel, the abbey beer. This beer is no longer brewed within the abbey itself but in a commercial brewery in Opwijk. The abbey also produces cheese. Since 1994, the monks have also exploited a botanical garden of medicinal plants, where they cultivate ginseng.

See also
 Averbode Abbey
 List of carillons in Belgium

Sources
  Postel Abbey official website
  Postel Abbey botanical garden

Christian monasteries in Antwerp Province
Premonstratensian monasteries in Belgium
Mol, Belgium